Hathor 4 - Coptic Calendar - Hathor 6

The fifth day of the Coptic month of Hathor, the third month of the Coptic year. On a common year, this day corresponds to November 1, of the Julian Calendar, and November 14, of the Gregorian Calendar. This day falls in the Coptic season of Peret, the season of emergence.

Commemorations

Saints 

 The martyrdom of Saint Timothy the Deacon 
 The departure of Saint Joseph on the Shamah Mountain

Other commemorations 

 The appearance of the Head of Saint Longinus the Soldier 
 The relocation of the Body of Saint Theodore, the Prince, to the city of Shutb

References 

Days of the Coptic calendar